Gergen is the surname of several persons and a village:

David Gergen (born 1942), American political consultant
John Jay Gergen, American mathematician
Kenneth J. Gergen (born 1935), American psychologist and professor
Mary Gergen, American social psychologist
Gergen, Araç, a village in Araç District, Kastamonu province, Turkey

Surnames of German origin
German-language surnames